Bird shot can mean either:

Bird shot, an incident when a bird hits an aircraft.
Birdshot, a kind of shotgun shell.
Birdshot chorioretinopathy, a rare form of bilateral posterior uveitis affecting the eye.